"Shoulder Lean" is a song by American hip hop recording artist Young Dro, released to rhythmic contemporary radio on May 2, 2006, as his debut single and the lead single from his first album Best Thang Smokin'.  The song features Dro's fellow American rapper and Grand Hustle label chief T.I. on the hook. The production was handled by Grand Hustle in-house producer Cordale "Lil' C" Quinn. The song was a hit in the United States, reaching the Top 10 on the Billboard Hot 100 and number one on the Hot R&B/Hip Hop Songs chart. This was Young Dro's only hit single as a lead artist,  and T.I.'s fourth Top 10 single.

A freestyle over the song's production, entitled "Live from the 504" by Lil Wayne, is featured on his mixtape Da Drought 3 (2007).

Music video
The music video for "Shoulder Lean", directed by President Thomas Forbes, makes references to the respective video of the Dr. Dre and Snoop Dogg song "Nuthin But A "G" Thang". The video includes cameo appearances from DJ Drama, DJ Khaled, Slim Thug, Big Gipp of Goodie Mob and Parlae of Dem Franchize Boyz.

Charts

Weekly charts

Year-end charts

Certifications

Radio and release history

See also
Young Dro discography
T.I. discography
List of number-one R&B hits

References

2006 debut singles
Young Dro songs
T.I. songs
Songs written by T.I.
Songs written by Lil' C (record producer)
Grand Hustle Records singles
Atlantic Records singles